The Eastern Collegiate Hockey League was an ACHA Division I club hockey league that consisted of teams in the Northeast United States. The league consisted of 6 teams from schools in New York and Pennsylvania.

Format
The ECHL's had seven member teams that played a 10-game regular season conference schedule. The season concluded with the post-season ECHL Tournament. An automatic bid to the ACHA National Championship Tournament was awarded to the winner of the regular season.

Former Teams

Note: Canisius, Mercyhurst, Niagara, RIT, and Robert Morris all have NCAA Division I hockey teams competing in Atlantic Hockey.

Conference arenas

External links
 ECHL website

See also
American Collegiate Hockey Association
List of ice hockey leagues

ACHA Division 1 conferences
Defunct college sports conferences in the United States